The kopek or kopeck is or was a coin or a currency unit of a number of countries in Eastern Europe closely associated with the economy of Russia. It is usually the smallest denomination within a currency system; 100 kopeks are worth 1 ruble or 1 hryvnia.

Originally, the kopeck was the currency unit of Imperial Russia, the Russian Soviet Federative Socialist Republic and then the Soviet Union (as the Soviet ruble). , it is the currency unit of Russia, Belarus and Ukraine. The Russian kopeck is also used in two regions of Georgia, the partially recognised states (including by Russia) of Abkhazia and South Ossetia. In the past, several other countries influenced by Russia and the Soviet Union had currency units that were also named kopecks.

The name of the coin of Azerbaijan comes from the word kopeck – gapik, (manat).

No country's kopeck is currently subdivided, although the denga (½ kopeck) and polushka (¼ kopeck) were minted off and on for centuries, until the fall of the Romanov dynasty in February 1917 (O.S.) / March 1917 (N.S.).

Origins 

The first kopek coins, minted at Novgorod and Pskov from about 1534 onwards, show a horseman with a spear. From the 1540s on, the horseman bore a crown; doubtless the intention was to represent Ivan the Terrible, Grand Prince of all Russia until 1547, and Czar thereafter. Subsequent minting of the coin, starting in the 18th century, instead bore Saint George striking down a serpent with spear, hence kopek from kop'yo (копьё).

Expressions 

In French, kopeck usually designates something of little value or interest: "cela ne vaut pas un kopek"

References

External links 

Denominations (currency)
Coins of Azerbaijan
Coins of Russia
Coins of Ukraine
Coins of Belarus